Acalyptris melanospila is a moth of the family Nepticulidae. It was described by Edward Meyrick in 1934. It is known from Bombay, India. The hostplant for the species is Randia dumetorum.

References

Nepticulidae
Endemic fauna of India
Moths of Asia
Moths described in 1934